Gorilla at Large is a 1954 American horror mystery film made in 3-D. The film stars Cameron Mitchell, Anne Bancroft, Lee J. Cobb and Raymond Burr, with Lee Marvin and Warren Stevens in supporting roles.  Directed by Harmon Jones, it was made by Panoramic Productions, and distributed through 20th Century Fox in Technicolor and 3-D.

It is notable for being one of the early movies at 20th Century Fox to be filmed in 3-D. (The first was Inferno, released a year before Gorilla at Large.)

Plot
Cyrus Miller's carnival has come to town. Its chief draw is a big, bad gorilla named Goliath. Each night, Goliath is teased by a tantalizing trapeze artist named Laverne (Anne Bancroft). She swings back and forth, just out of reach from the simian's upraised arms. Naturally, this frustrates Goliath, but audiences are thrilled. However, Cyrus (Raymond Burr) thinks the act is getting old. So he promotes carnival barker Joey (Cameron Mitchell) from pitchman to performer. Joey will don a black, hairy gorilla costume and become Goliath's replacement. The difference is this time Laverne will fall from the trapeze and into the arms of a grunting, bellowing Joey. The idea seems promising to everyone but Kovacs (Peter Whitney), Goliath's trainer, who's about to become unemployed. Joey has a fiancée named Audrey (Charlotte Austin), and she's not happy either. She knows Laverne's a hot little number with a reputation to match. This new act means Laverne will be working closely with her intended.

That evening, the carnival's crooked concessionaire, Morse, is found dead near Goliath's cage. Police speculate he ventured too close to the dangerous gorilla. But Joey becomes a suspect when it is learned he once threatened Morse for molesting Audrey. However, Joey believes Cyrus, who's sweet on the luscious Laverne, is out to frame him. In the meantime, Goliath escapes from his cage. Audrey's screams are heard from the Hall of Mirrors, and the carnival's crew rush to her aid. They find her safe, but another associate lies dead nearby. Nevertheless, the show must go on, so Laverne proceeds with her act. The only problem is the simian figure she's performing with is not Joey. It's actually Goliath. When the unsuspecting Laverne does her planned drop, she realizes too late that she is in the arms of Goliath, who carries a screaming Laverne to the top of the carnival's roller coaster. The gorilla dies in a hail of bullets. And the murderer? (Don't read further if you haven't seen the film.) It turns out to be Laverne, who reveals she was one of Morse's blackmail victims. As she is led away by police, Joey and Audrey resolve to quit the carnival.

Cast
 Cameron Mitchell as Joey Matthews
 Anne Bancroft as Laverne Miller
 Lee J. Cobb as Detective Sergeant Garrison
 Raymond Burr as Cy Miller
 Charlotte Austin as Audrey Baxter
 Peter Whitney as Kovacs, the gorilla's keeper
 Lee Marvin as Shaughnessy the Cop
 Warren Stevens as Joe the Detective
 John Kellogg as Morse (as John G. Kellogg)
 Charles Tannen as Owens

For an independent production, Gorilla at Large was unusual because it featured both seasoned actors and upcoming stars.

Cameron Mitchell had appeared in the 1951 screen version of Arthur Miller's Death of a Salesman, then was signed as a contract star with 20th Century Fox. For Anne Bancroft, Gorilla was her fifth film under contract to 20th Century Fox]], and in 1962 her performance in The Miracle Worker won her an Academy Award. Lee J. Cobb had a prolific screen career and received two Oscar nominations, the first for On the Waterfront, made the same year as Gorilla at Large.

Raymond Burr's imposing stature and dark brooding looks often landed him the role of the villain before his breakout role of lawyer Perry Mason. The movie was released the same year he appeared as the chief antagonist in Alfred Hitchcock's Rear Window. Lee Marvin began his film career in Hollywood in the early 1950s, playing mainly crooks or cops, and later became a leading man.

George Barrows impersonated Goliath, one of many gorilla roles in his film and TV career. The most famous of these was as the alien Ro-Man in Robot Monster (1953), also a 3-D production, in which he wore a gorilla suit with a diving helmet on his head.

Production
Production for Gorilla at Large took place at Nu Pike Amusement Park in Long Beach, California. The crew had the use of the amusement park from midnight until morning for approximately a week.

Although released through 20th Century Fox, the film was made by Leonard Goldstein's Panoramic Productions. The idea behind the deal that was made between the two companies was that Fox would focus and release primarily CinemaScope films, and Panoramic would be its supplier of flat widescreen ratio films. The only other 3-D productions released or produced by Fox until Ice Age: Dawn of the Dinosaurs in 2009 were the previous year's Inferno, with Robert Ryan and Rhonda Fleming, and 1960's September Storm, with Joanne Dru and Mark Stevens.

Rather than make different posters for the 2-D and 3-D release of this movie, only a flat (non 3-D) poster was made. Poster snipes with 3-D were furnished to use on the posters for theatres showing the 3-D version. This was common practice at the point that the film was released because fewer theaters were booking 3-D films in their stereoscopic form.

Reception
Bosley Crowther of The New York Times called Gorilla at Large a "straight scoop of melodramatic muck about murder and other odd distractions at an outdoor amusement park."

TV Guide wrote "This often hilarious 3-D thriller stars Bancroft as a trapeze artist at an amusement park, where the top attraction is a ferocious gorilla".

Cameron Mitchell recalled that he met Mel Brooks when both were dining at the Metro-Goldwyn-Mayer Commissary. Brooks told him that Gorilla at Large was his favorite film and asked him if he wanted to play a Jimmy Hoffa-type character in a movie for him that was the 1982 comedy My Favorite Year.

Releases
 A dual projection polarized 3-D print of Gorilla at Large was screened at both The World 3-D Expos, most recently at the Second World 3-D Expo on September 17, 2006 at the American Cinematheque's Egyptian Theatre in Hollywood and at the 3-D at the Castro film festival October 17, 2006 at the Castro Theatre in San Francisco.
 Gorilla at Large was released on DVD on September 11, 2007.

References

External links

 
 

1954 films
1950s mystery films
Circus films
American mystery films
American 3D films
20th Century Fox films
1954 3D films
Films directed by Harmon Jones
1950s English-language films
1950s American films